Lestidium is a genus of barracudina. They are sometimes referred to as pike smelt.

Species
There are currently three recognized species in this genus:
 Lestidium atlanticum Borodin, 1928 (Atlantic barracudina)
Lestidium australis 
Lestidium longilucifer 
Lestidium nudum C. H. Gilbert, 1905 (Deep water pike smelt)
 Lestidium prolixum Harry, 1953
Lestidium rofeni

References

Paralepididae
Marine fish genera
Ray-finned fish genera
Taxa named by Charles Henry Gilbert